Kaleena Renae McNabb (born 1984), better known by her stage name K'Lee, is a New Zealand pop singer who released her first single in 2001 at the age of 16, while still attending Waitakere College in West Auckland.

Career
K'Lee's first single was a cover of Mr. Mister's "Broken Wings" which peaked at number 2 on the New Zealand Singles Chart. Her second single was "1+1+1, It Ain't Two", a song about being insulted by her boyfriend. K'lee's third single was "Can You Feel Me?" which became her biggest hit to date within the country.

Her debut self-titled album debuted at number 7 on the New Zealand Albums Chart and peaked at number 4 a week later. The album spent only seven weeks in the albums chart and went on to sell 7,000 copies throughout New Zealand.

K'Lee appeared on season 2 Celebrity Treasure Island and was eliminated first for falling sick during initial filming of the series. 
She has worked for Flava FM where the DJ role was highly successful and she became one of the most popular radio Dj's from that station.

In 2012, she released her brand new single, 'Tables Have Turned', on 7 June. It was her first single in ten years since she took a hiatus from the music scene. She also announced that she would release her second studio album in late 2012 but it never came to fruition. In that same year, she hosted the late night show Aotearoa Social Club.

As of 2013, K'Lee currently works as radio as a DJ host for Auckland's R&B and hip hop radio station Mai FM. While she's not working, K'Lee regularly jams with musicians across venues in Auckland. In an interview in August 2013 she revealed more plans to record new material in the future with producers and writers.

In 2019, K'Lee was a participant in Dancing with the Stars NZ.

Discography

Albums

Singles

References

1984 births
New Zealand people of Scottish descent
Living people
People educated at Waitakere College
21st-century New Zealand women singers